Jay O'Brien may refer to:
 Jay O'Brien (ice hockey)
 Jay O'Brien (bobsleigh)
 Jay O'Brien (Virginia politician)